The Gunnison grouse, Gunnison sage-grouse or lesser sage-grouse (Centrocercus minimus), is a species of grouse endemic to the United States. It is similar to the closely related greater sage-grouse (Centrocercus urophasianus) in appearance, but about a third smaller in size, with much thicker plumes behind the head; it also has a less elaborate courtship dance. It is restricted in range to southwestern Colorado and extreme southeastern Utah, with the largest population residing in the Gunnison Basin region in Colorado. Despite being native to a country where the avifauna is relatively well known, it was overlooked until the 1990s due to the similarities with the sage grouse, and only described as a new species in 2000—making it the first new avian species to be described from the USA since the 19th century. The description of C. minimus as a separate species is supported by a molecular study of genetic variation, showing that gene flow between the large-bodied and the small-bodied birds is absent.

Breeding
Gunnison sage-grouse are notable for their elaborate courtship rituals. Each spring, males congregate on leks and perform a "strutting display". Groups of females observe these displays and select the most attractive males with which to mate. Only a few males do most of the breeding. Males perform on leks for several hours in the early morning and evening during the spring. Leks are generally open areas adjacent to dense sagebrush stands, and the same lek may be used by grouse for decades.

Conservation
This species is in decline because of loss of habitat; their range has shrunk. Following petitions, the species was proposed for listing under the Endangered Species Act by the United States Fish and Wildlife Service, and was eventually protected in 2015. The known population size of this species remains quite small, and it was estimated that fewer than 4,000 individuals existed in when the species was successfully protected under the Act. A 2019 survey found the population in Colorado to be reduced to an estimated 1,800 birds with only around 429 reproductive males, a record low for the species since surveys began.

Distribution
Gunnison sage-grouse occur in seven counties in southwestern Colorado and one county in southeastern Utah. It was once found in Arizona, New Mexico, and Oklahoma, but is now extirpated in those states.

Lifecycle
Males gather on the lek or strutting grounds, which are small, open areas where breeding occurs, in late February to April, as soon as the lek is relatively free of snow. Only a few dominant males, usually two, breed.  After mating, the hen leaves the lek for the nesting grounds. Clutch size ranges from six to eight eggs; incubation time is 25 to 27 days. Sage-grouse apparently have high rates of nest desertion and nest predation.

Preferred habitat
Gunnison sage-grouse are totally dependent on sagebrush-dominated habitats. Sagebrush is a crucial component of the adult's  diet year-round, and they select sagebrush almost exclusively for cover. However, in order to rear a brood of chicks, the young require high protein broadleaved plants and wildflowers that bring insects, also for protein. However, cattle and sheep also relish these plants, and the removal of these critical chick-food plants is a major reason for this bird's decline.

References

Gunnison grouse
Birds of the Great Basin
Endemic birds of the Western United States
Gunnison grouse
Gunnison grouse
Gunnison grouse
Gunnison grouse
Gunnison grouse
Gunnison grouse
ESA threatened species